Front Royal Historic District is a national historic district located at Front Royal, Warren County, Virginia. The district encompasses approximately 470 contributing buildings and structures in the town of Front Royal.  It has a mix of commercial, residential, industrial, religious and governmental buildings dating from the late-18th to mid-20th centuries.  Notable buildings include the former Proctor-Biggs Mill (c. 1922), a former apple warehouse, Murphy's Theater (1908-1909), Compton's Corner (c. 1905), first Bank of Warren, Trout Drugstore Building, second Bank of Warren building (1914), Montview Hotel (c. 1868), Park Theater (c. 1920), the Henry Trout House (c. 1800), Mullen-Trout House (c. 1815), Giles-Cooke House (c. 1850), and the Dr. Manly Littleton Garrison (c. 1882).  Located in the district and separately listed are the Balthis House and Warren County Courthouse.

It was listed on the National Register of Historic Places in 2003.

References

Front Royal, Virginia
Historic districts on the National Register of Historic Places in Virginia
Historic districts in Warren County, Virginia
National Register of Historic Places in Warren County, Virginia